The Queens is a 2015 Chinese romance film based on the novel of the same name. The film is directed by Annie Yi and produced by Annie Yi and Ann An. It stars Song Hye-kyo, Shawn Dou, Joe Chen, Tony Yang, Vivian Wu, Jiang Wu, Joe Cheng, Qin Hao, and Annie Yi. The Queens was released on 16 April 2015.

Cast
 Song Hye-kyo as Annie
 Shawn Dou as Mark
 Joe Chen as Candy
 Tony Yang as Tony
 Vivian Wu as Tina
 Jiang Wu as Jiawei
 Joe Cheng as Wang Ziyu
 Qin Hao as Zhang Yi
 Annie Yi as Melissa
 Sean Sun as Leo

Production
Filming took place in Beijing and Shanghai.

Release
The film was originally to be released on 7 November 2014 but was pushed back to 16 April 2015.

References

External links
 
 
 

2015 romantic drama films
2015 films
Chinese romantic drama films
Films based on Chinese novels
Films shot in Beijing
Films shot in Shanghai
2010s Mandarin-language films